The Niumatou Site is an archaeological site dating from  the mid Neolithic period in Qingshui District, Taichung, Taiwan. It is the oldest archaeological site in central Taiwan. The site has been designated as a historical relic by then Taichung County Government.

History
Civilizations around the area started around 4,000 years ago when prehistoric people lived within the area during the Neolithic age. They knew how to use stone tools and pottery. Because large numbers of stone hoes were unearthed, archaeologists think that those prehistoric people probably relied largely on farming for food. However, they also went hunting to add more variety to their menu. The site was originally discovered in May 2002, when a student found pottery shards in the area. He collected the fragments and then handed it over to a professor in the Department of Anthropology at the National Museum of Natural Science in Taichung.

Transportation
The site is accessible within walking distance north east of Qingshui Station of Taiwan Railways.

See also
 Prehistory of Taiwan
 Beinan Cultural Park

References

Archaeological sites in Taiwan
Buildings and structures in Taichung